KQBO 107.5 FM is a radio station licensed to Rio Grande City, Texas.  The station broadcasts a Regional Mexican format and is owned by Sound Investments Unlimited, Inc.

References

External links

QBO
Regional Mexican radio stations in the United States